Tillandsia botterii is a species in the genus Tillandsia. It is endemic to Mexico.

References

botterii
Flora of Mexico